A tern is a seabird in the family Laridae.

Tern or TERN may also refer to:

Tern
Alan Tern (born 1976), Singaporean actor
Miller Tern, an American single-seat glider
River Tern, a river in Shropshire, England
Tern (company), a folding bicycle company in Taiwan
Tern oilfield, Shetland basin in Scotland
, more than one United States Navy ship
SY Tern, a historic passenger vessel in England

TERN
Trans-European road network
Tactically Exploited Reconnaissance Node, a DARPA project

See also
Term (disambiguation)
Turn (disambiguation)